MAGMA Gießereitechnologie GmbH is a  developer and supplier of software for casting process simulation.

Introduction 
The company was founded in 1988 and has its headquarters in Aachen, Germany. MAGMA's product and service portfolio includes simulation software MAGMASOFT, with the newest release MAGMA5, as well as engineering services for casting design and optimization. The software is used world-wide by foundries, casting buyers and designers, especially for the optimization of cast components in automotive and heavy industry applications. German newspaper Süddeutsche Zeitung cites MAGMA amongst the global market leaders for simulation software for casting processes.

Worldwide, MAGMA employs more than 200 people in software development, support, marketing, and administration, of which 90 are in Aachen. The company also has offices and subsidiaries in the United States, Singapore, Brazil, Korea, Turkey, India, China, and the Czech Republic.

MAGMA5

MAGMA5 is used for the simulation of casting processes. The software stands for the prediction of the entire casting component quality and process chain by providing a better understanding of mold filling, solidification and cooling and allows the quantitative prediction of mechanical properties, thermal stresses and distortions of the resulting castings. The simulation describes a cast component's quality up-front before production starts and the casting method can be designed with respect to the required component properties. This results in a reduction in pre-production sampling as the precise layout of the complete casting system leads to energy, material, and tooling savings.

MAGMA5 consists of a base module and a set of additional modules that cover all steps of the casting production. The range of application of MAGMA solutions comprises all cast alloys, from cast iron to aluminum sand casting, permanent mold and die casting up to large steel castings. The software supports the user in the modeling of the component, the determination of melting practice and casting methoding through to model and mold making, heat treatment, and finishing.

External links 
 Official Website: MAGMA GmbH, Germany

References 

Companies based in Aachen
Software companies of Germany